John Lockman may refer to:
 John Lockman (author), English author
 John Lockman (priest), Canon of Windsor
 John Thomas Lockman, American lawyer and Union Army soldier